Beach volleyball at the 2008 Asian Beach Games was held from 18 to 25 October 2008 in Bali, Indonesia.

Medalists

Medal table

Results

Men

Preliminaries

Pool A

Pool B

Pool C

Pool D

Pool E

Pool F

Pool G

Pool H

Pool I

Pool J

Fourth-placed teams

Rank 33–41

Rank 39–41

Rank 37–38

Rank 33–36

Round of 32

Rank 17–32

Rank 25/29

Rank 17/21

Final round

Rank 9/13

Rank 5/7

Women

Preliminaries

Pool A

Pool B

Pool C

Pool D

Pool E

Pool F

Second-placed teams

Round of 32

Rank 17–24

Rank 21/23

Rank 17/19

Final round

Rank 9/13

Rank 5/7

References 
19 October Results
20 October Results
21 October Results
22 October Results
23 October Results
24 October Results

External links
Official page on AVC website
 Official site

2008 Asian Beach Games events
Asian Beach Games
2008